The Global U8 Consortium, abbreviated as GU8, is the organizational body that includes 8 universities from United Kingdom, China, Malaysia, South Korea, France, Germany, Brazil & Israel. It is a unique model of global collaboration between prestigious higher education institutions located in coastal cities.

GU8 Consortium focuses on three main areas:
Developing a joint education system, which may feature complementary curricula, distance learning (such as internet-based e-classes), credit transfers and joint degrees.
Conducting joint programmes of research and innovation. 
Building administrative capacity.

List of member institutions

References

Higher education in China
Professional associations based in China
Educational institutions established in 2004
2004 establishments in China
College and university associations and consortia in Asia